J31, J.31 or J-31 may refer to :

Vehicles 
 British Aerospace Jetstream J31, a British airliner
 Nissan Teana J31, a Japanese sedan
 , a Makar-class survey ship of the Indian Navy
 Shenyang J-31, a Chinese fighter jet
 LNER Class J31, a class of British steam locomotives

Other uses 
 General Electric J31, an American jet engine
 Ground Equipment Facility J-31, a former radar station in California
 Malaysia Federal Route J31
 Pentagonal gyrobicupola, a Johnson solid (J31)
 Rhinitis